The Kvinneby amulet (Öl SAS1989;43) is an 11th-century runic amulet found in the mid-1950s buried in the village of Södra Kvinneby in Öland, Sweden. The amulet is believed to date from roughly 1050-1130 CE.  The amulet is a square copper plate measuring approximately 5cm on each side. Near one edge there is a small hole, presumably used for hanging it around the neck.

Inscription
The inscription consists of some 143 runes, written boustrophedon, supplemented by an engraving of a fish; the relevance of the fish to the text is unclear.

The inscription is one of the longest and best preserved for its time but it has proven hard to interpret. The "official" Rundata interpretation is:

Deciphering attempts

There have been six other serious attempts to decipher the text. This article treats each in turn.

Bruce E. Nilsson 1976
Bruce E. Nilsson was the first to offer an interpretation of the amulet. Ignoring what seem to be bind runes at the start of the inscription, he offered this transliteration:

tiʀþiʀbirk
bufimiʀfultihu
risþeʀuisinbral
tilufranbufaþorketih
ansmiʀþemhamrisamhuʀ
hafikamflufraniluit
feʀekiafbufakuþiʀu
untiʀhanumaukyfiʀhan
um

and the following translation into English:

Nilsson interprets: "[T]he amulet is an invocation to the gods to protect Bove, especially while he is at sea." This he bases on the carving of the fish, the mention of the sea in the text and the place where the amulet was found.

Nilsson understands the mention of Thor and his hammer as a reference of the story of Thor's fishing; where he threw his hammer at the head of Jörmungandr, the Midgard serpent. Since Thor's hammer always returns to its thrower it might in this case be said that it 'fled from evil' and 'came from the sea'.

Nilsson does not attempt to solve the first few runic symbols of the inscription. He ventures a guess that they might conceal the name or cognomen of a god. The fish looks more promising to Nilsson. He suggests that it might contain coded runes. The fins of the fish can, according to him, be represented graphically as:

|| | ||
|| || |

This might represent the runes 'nbh' in some order. Nilsson suggests that the meaning is based on the names of the runes; thus the amulet should give a björg from hagl and nauð or a "deliverance" from "hail" and "need". He adds that this is "not at all certain".

Nilsson's interpretation is not treated critically by later authors.

Ivar Lindquist 1987 (a posthumous publication)
Ivar Lindquist took some 30 years to ponder the amulet. He offers a plethora of interpretations - all, however, within the same central theme. According to Lindquist the amulet contains a solemn prayer to the Earth Goddess, referred to as 'Erka', 'Fold' and 'Undirgoð' (:the god beneath) and her 'single son' Thor.

Two of Lindquist's suggested interpretations are:

Also:

On etymological grounds Lindquist reasons that Ámr is a demon of sickness.

Börje Westlund 1989
According to Westlund, Lindquist's attempts at deciphering the "bind runes" at the beginning of the inscription are misguided. In Westlund's opinion these are not complicated bind runes but elaborate forms of normal runes. To support his claim he compares the runes with an inscription found near Novgorod in 1983 and treated by the Russian runologist Elena Melnikova in 1987. This is material not available to Lindquist and Nilsson.

Westlund reads the first runes as "hiristikþirbirkbufi" and takes them to mean (in standardized West Norse) "Hér rísti ek þér björg Bófi." which would come out in English as "Here I carve protection for you, Bófi." This is a major change from Lindquist's interpretation. Instead of Bófi being the carver talking about himself we have a separate carver that addresses Bófi in the inscription.

Westlund goes on to refuse Lindquist's "prayer to Earth" in favor of a more magical interpretation. While he rejects Lindquist's interpretation of "meRfultihuþis" ("with Earth in mind") and Nilsson's interpretation of "samhuRhafikam" ("that came from the sea") he does not offer alternative explanations. On the whole he suggests that Lindquist read too much into the inscription and tries to go for a more "mundane" solution to the problem. His transliteration and translation of the whole inscription follow:

x hiristik þiʀ birk / bufi meʀ fultihu / þis þeʀ uis in bral / tilu fran bufa þor keti h / ans miʀ þem hamri samhuʀ / hafikam fly fran iluit feʀ eki af bufa kuþ iʀu / untiʀ hanum auk yfiʀ han / um

In his conclusion Westlund rejects Lindquist's view of the amulet as a solemn heathen prayer. In his opinion the mention of Thor and 'the gods' reflect a post-conversion magical view of the heathen gods. He even goes as far as suggesting that the wearer of the amulet was probably a baptised Christian.

Ottar Grønvik 1992

In 1992 Ottar Grønvik offered a new interpretation which is essentially an attempt to rehabilitate Lindquist's work. Lindquist's bind-runes are brought back into play.

h(i)ʀiurkimsutiʀkuþiʀbirk
bufimeʀfultihu
þisþeʀuisinbral
tilufranbufaþorketih
ansmiʀþemhamrisamhyʀ
hafikamflyfraniluit
feʀekiafbufakuþiʀu
untiʀhanumaukyfiʀhan
um

Jonna Louis-Jensen 2001
In 2001 Jonna Louis-Jensen continued in the same vein as Grønvik with an interpretation involving a sickness demon named Ámr. She offers the following normalized text and English translation.

Pereswetoff-Morath 2019
As part of her dissertation "Viking-Age Runic Plates: Readings and Interpretations", Sofia Pereswetoff-Morath discusses this find. She chooses to read the "bindrunes" at the start as a form of encryption which introduces meaningless staves to make reading more difficult, noting that bindrunes occur nowhere else in the inscription, even in places where they would have been useful. She advocates for a broad dating of 1050-1130.

Her reading most closely resembles that of Bruce E. Nilsson, disregarding all speculation about a demon Ámr.

 English: ”Here I carve (may I carve/carved) help for you, Bove, with complete assistance. Fire is safe for you (known to you), (the fire which) took all evil away from Bove. May Thor protect him with the hammer which came from the sea. Flee from the evil one! Magic (evil) achieves nothing with Bove. Gods are under him and over him.”

Gallery

See also
Ribe skull fragment
Runic magic
Seeland-II-C
Sigtuna amulet I
Solberga plates
Högstena plates

References
Citations

Bibliography

Further reading
 Nilsson, Bruce E. (1976). The Runic 'Fish-Amulet' from Öland: A Solution. In Mediaeval Scandinavia Vol. 9, Year 1976.
 Lindquist, Ivar (1987). Religiösa runtexter III. Kvinneby-amuletten. Ett tydningsförslag efter författarens efterlämnade manuskript utg. av Gösta Holm.
 Westlund, Börje (1989). Kvinneby - en runinskrift med hittills okända gudanamn? In Studia anthroponymica Scandinavica : tidsskrift för nordisk personnamnsforskning, Vol. 7, 1989, pp. 25–52. Lundequistska bokhandeln.
 Grønvik, Ottar (1992). En hedensk bønn. Runeinnskriften på en liten kopperplate fra Kvinneby på Öland. In Finn Hødnebø et al. (Eds.), Eyvindarbók. Festskrift til Eyvind Fjeld Halvorsen 4. mai 1992, pp. 71–85. Institutt for nordistikk og litteraturvitenskap.
 Louis-Jensen, Jonna (2001). Halt illu frān Būfa! Til tolkningen af Kvinneby-amuletten fra Öland. In Séamas Ó Catháin (Ed.), Northern Lights: Following Folklore in North-Western Europe: Essays in honor of Bo Almqvist, pp. 111–126. Dublin: University College Dublin. 
 Pereswetoff-Morath, Sofia. (2019) Viking-Age runic plates. Readings and interpretations. Acta Academiae Gustavi Adolphi 155. Runrön 21. Uppsala. pp. 113-151. ISSN 0065-0897 and 1100-1690, .

11th-century inscriptions
1950s archaeological discoveries
Archaeology of Sweden
Runic inscriptions
Historical runic magic
Norse paganism
Sources on Germanic paganism
Occult texts
Amulets
Thor